HD 219659 is suspected variable star in the equatorial constellation of Aquarius.

References

External links
 Image HD 219659

Aquarius (constellation)
219659
A-type subgiants
8856
Suspected variables
115015
Durchmusterung objects